Nga thalaut paung is a freshwater hilsa fish dish from Burmese cuisine. The bony fish is cooked for hours with soy sauce, vinegar, tomatoes in lemongrass. The preparation melts the bones away.

References

Burmese cuisine
Fish dishes